Efim Drabkin, better known by his pen name Efraim Sevela (8 March 1928, Babruysk, Belarus18 August 2010) was a Soviet writer, screenwriter, director, producer, who after his emigration from the Soviet Union lived in Israel, USA and Russia.

Efraim Sevela was born to Jewish parents. His father was an officer. During World War 2, him and his family were evacuated from the frontline in 1941. After finishing school Sevela was admitted into the Belarusian State University and became a screenwriter for many Soviet patriotic films. At the end of the 1960s, Sevela joined the Jewish Soviet dissidents and took part in the capture of the main office of the head of the Soviet government in 1971. Sevela was expatriated to Israel. Aссording to his own words, the 45-year-old Sevela participated in the Yom Kippur War where he was wounded. In 1977 he left Israel for the United States. Efraim Sevela worked and lived in many cities such as London, Paris, and West Berlin.

In 1990 Efraim Sevela came back to the USSR and started filming very successful movies based on his works.

Filmography 
Screenwriter:
 Annushka (1959)
 Nashi sosedi (1957)
 Krepkiy oreshek (1967)
 Goden k nestroevoy (1968)
Director:
 Kolysanka (1986) Lullaby, Kolybelnaja
 Popugay, govoryashchiy na idish (1990) Попугай, говорящий на идиш (Soviet Union: Russian title) The Parrot Speaking Yiddish
 Noyev kovcheg (1992) Ноев ковчег (Russia) Noah's Ark
 Blagotvoritelnyy bal (1993) Благотворительный бал (Russia) Charity ball
 Belye dyuny (1996) The White Dunes
Actor:
 Noyev kovcheg (1992) Ноев ковчег (Russia) Noah's Ark
Producer:
 Noyev kovcheg (1992) Ноев ковчег (Russia) Noah's Ark
 Blagotvoritelnyy bal (1993) Благотворительный бал (Russia) Charity ball

Novels
Monya Tsatskes (Monya Cackes )
We Were Not Like Other People.
Farewell, Israel!
Toyota Corolla
Legends From Invalid Street
Truth is for Strangers
Why There is no Heaven on Earth
Odessa-Mama 2003

External links
Efraim Sevela's works in Russian

1928 births
2010 deaths
People from Babruysk
Belarusian Jews
Russian writers
Soviet dissidents
Jewish writers
Belarusian State University alumni
Soviet expatriates in Israel
Soviet expatriates in the United States
Soviet expatriates in the United Kingdom
Soviet expatriates in Germany
Soviet expatriates in France